The 1906–07 Chicago Maroons men's basketball team represented the University of Chicago in intercollegiate basketball during the 1906–07 season. The team finished the season with a 21–2 record and were named national champions by the Helms Athletic Foundation. This was the first of three consecutive seasons that Chicago claimed the Helms national championship.  The team played their home games on campus at Frank Dickinson Bartlett Gymnasium.

Both Albert Houghton and John Schommer were named All-Americans. For Schommer, it was his second straight All-American honor; for Houghton, it was his first and only time being honored.

Roster

Source

Schedule
Source											

|-	
|- align="center" bgcolor=""

|- align="center" bgcolor=""

	

|- align="center" bgcolor=""

	

|-

References

Chicago Maroons men's basketball seasons
NCAA Division I men's basketball tournament championship seasons
Chicago
Chicago Maroons Men's Basketball Team
Chicago Maroons Men's Basketball Team